Julian Rauchfuss (born 2 September 1994), also spelt Julian Rauchfuß, is a German World Cup alpine ski racer, who specialises in the technical events of slalom and giant slalom.

He competed at the 2021–22 FIS Alpine Ski World Cup.

References 

1994 births
Living people
People from Mindelheim
Sportspeople from Swabia (Bavaria)
German male alpine skiers
Olympic alpine skiers of Germany
Alpine skiers at the 2022 Winter Olympics
Medalists at the 2022 Winter Olympics
Olympic medalists in alpine skiing
Olympic silver medalists for Germany
21st-century German people